Ante Jurić (1 February 1934 – 4 September 2013) was a Yugoslav professional footballer who played as a goalkeeper for Hajduk Split.

Club career
Jurić began his career with Jedinstvo Kopilica, before joining NK Hajduk Split at the age of 19. He made his first appearance for Hajduk on 4 December 1955, against BSK Beograd (which finished as a 0–2 defeat). He made 243 appearances for Hajduk (91 league matches, 11 cup ties and 141 friendlies), scoring once.

In 1964, he transferred to Arsenal Split in second tier of the Yugoslav football system. One season later, he was signed to Uskok Split in the third tier of Yugoslavia. He played there until he reached the age of 38.

International career
Jurić was capped once for Yugoslavia on 26 April 1959, in a friendly against Switzerland in Basel (which finished as a 5–1 win). This match was his only appearance for Yugoslavia, as a medical examination allegedly revealed a "shadow in his lung", the player was benched by his club for six months. Years later Jurić learned from viable sources that the diagnosis was misleading, possibly initiated due to his public wearing of Christian symbols.

Personal life
Jurić was married and fathered two daughters, Ines and Željana.

References

External links
 Player presentation on Serbian Federation site
 

1934 births
2013 deaths
Footballers from Split, Croatia
Association football goalkeepers
Yugoslav footballers
Yugoslavia international footballers
HNK Hajduk Split players
RNK Split players
NK Uskok players
Yugoslav First League players
Burials at Lovrinac Cemetery